André Cymone (born Andre Simon Anderson; June 27, 1958) is an American bassist, songwriter and record producer.  Cymone was a bass guitarist for Prince's touring band, pre-Revolution. Cymone began a solo career in 1981. His song, "The Dance Electric" (written by Prince), reached #10 on the R&B charts in 1985. Cymone later co-wrote and produced hit songs for other acts, including his then wife Jody Watley's "Looking for a New Love" and "Real Love".

Cymone's stage name comes from a variation of his middle name, Simon.

Biography

Early years
Cymone was born in Minneapolis, Minnesota, United States. The son of Fred Anderson, a musician, and Bernadette, a social worker, Cymone was the youngest of six children. The Anderson home soon had an additional member – a young Prince who left his own home due to conflicts with his father. Prince's cousin Charles Smith started the band Grand Central and later invited Cymone. The band included Cymone's sister Linda and Morris Day — they later changed their name to Champagne due to being confused with the funk band Graham Central Station. Around this same, in 1975, Pepe Willie (the former husband of another of Prince's cousins), started the funk band 94 East, with members Cymone and Prince.

Career
In the late 1970s, after Prince released his debut album, For You, Prince recruited Cymone as bassist for his touring band. Cymone stayed with Prince until 1981, when he quit the band over tensions with Prince.

The two later resolved their issues and Cymone, managed by Owen Husney, went on to release 3 solo albums – Livin' In The New Wave (1982), Survivin' in the 80s (1983), and AC (1985). All were out of print for a long period of time, but all three of his solo records have been remastered and expanded with extra tracks. His only successful single – a song written by Prince – was "The Dance Electric" from AC.

Cymone went on to become a producer and is better known for producing Jody Watley (to whom he was married and shares a son). He has also produced and written songs for several other artists, including Evelyn "Champagne" King, Pebbles, Jermaine Stewart, The Girls, Pretty Poison and Adam Ant. In 1988, Cymone produced three tracks and co-wrote the track "Under My Skin" for Phil Thornalley's 1988 only solo album Swamp.

His song "Better Way", performed by James Ingram, featured on the Beverly Hills Cop II soundtrack released in 1987.

In September 2012 Cymone released a digital single, titled "America", in aid of United States President Barack Obama's re-election campaign with all proceeds from the sale of the digital single being donated to the campaign. The single is available through andrecymone.bandcamp.com, via digital download. A sneak-peek at a new song titled "American Dream" was available for a limited time for everyone who donated by purchasing "America".

In 2012, Cymone confirmed he was working on a new album, bringing an end to a 27-year singing hiatus.

In May 2013 Cymone released a demo on his Twitter/Facebook page called "My Best Friend", a six-minute long acoustic track he described as a tribute to his mother Bernadette Anderson.

In late May 2013 Cymone appeared alongside former Revolution member Bobby Z on a web-based video chat forum co-hosted by celebrity blogger Dr. Funkenberry where he went into greater detail about the writing of the song and the hopes for his new album.

In November 2013, the album, titled The Stone, became available for pre-order in various exclusive packages on the site PledgeMusic. The packages included early MP3 downloads, signed CDs and one-off personalised items. The Stone was released on February 18, 2014.

Andre Cymone released his sixth studio album, 1969, on April 7, 2017, via BandCamp and iTunes.

Discography

Albums
Livin' in the New Wave (1982), Columbia #49 US R&B
Survivin' in the 80s (1983), Columbia #28 US R&B
AC (1985), Columbia #31 US R&B
The Stone (2014), Blindtango
Black Man in America EP (2016), Blindtango
1969 (2017), Blindtango

Singles
"Livin' in the New Wave" (1982) 
"Kelly's Eyes" #107 Hot 100 #72 R&B charts (1982)
"Survivin' in the 80s" (1983)
"Make Me Wanna Dance" (1983) #37 R&B charts
"What Are We Doing Here (1983) 
"Body Thang featuring Germain Brooks (1983) 
"The Dance Electric" (1985) #10 R&B charts
"Satisfaction" (1985)
"Lipstick Lover" (1985)

References

1958 births
Living people
Musicians from Minneapolis
American funk bass guitarists
American male bass guitarists
Columbia Records artists
The Revolution (band) members
20th-century African-American male singers
American male singers
American rhythm and blues bass guitarists
American rock singers
American soul singers
American funk singers
American rhythm and blues singers
American rock bass guitarists
Record producers from Minnesota
Songwriters from Minnesota
Singers from Minnesota
Guitarists from Minnesota
20th-century American bass guitarists
20th-century American male musicians
African-American songwriters
African-American guitarists
21st-century African-American people
American male songwriters